Ty Christopher Longley (September 4, 1971 – February 20, 2003) was an American guitarist. He was born in Sharon, Pennsylvania, and graduated from Brookfield High School in Brookfield, Ohio. He joined the band Great White in 2000, played in Samantha 7, The Bullet Boys, and played in Nick Menza's solo project. Longley also did session work for many artists, including Nancy Sinatra and Maestro Alex Gregory, and performed uncredited on many works of music.

Death 
Longley died in The Station nightclub fire on February 20, 2003, which claimed a total of 100 lives, reportedly after going back into the building to retrieve his guitar. When the fire started, Longley was performing on the nightclub's stage with the band Great White; he was the only band member to die in the fire. Longley was survived by his girlfriend Heidi (Peralta), who was three months pregnant with the couple's only child. Their son Acey Ty Christopher Longley was born on August 12, 2003. Acey is also a musician, and runs a charity for hospitalized children in his father's memory.

References

External links
Ty Longley Memorial website

1971 births
2003 deaths
20th-century American guitarists
21st-century American guitarists
Accidental deaths in Rhode Island
American heavy metal guitarists
Deaths from fire in the United States
Filmed deaths of entertainers
Great White members
Musicians who died on stage
People from Sharon, Pennsylvania
The Station nightclub fire